Azteca Deportes (currently known as TV Azteca Deportes) is the sports division of Mexico's TV Azteca television network. It produces sports events and regular sports programming aired on the Azteca Uno and Azteca 7 networks in Mexico and on Azteca América in the United States.

History
Azteca's predecessor, Imevisión, had carried some sports programming, notably including the 1988 and 1992 Summer Olympics and the 1992 Winter Olympics, as well as the 1986 and 1990 FIFA World Cups. Azteca increased its sports programming upon privatization in 1993.

Current programs

Liga MX
TV Azteca owns Mazatlán F.C., and carries the home matches of this teams as well as Club Puebla, Atlas F.C., FC Juárez, Club Necaxa, Querétaro F.C. and C.D. Guadalajara. In some cases, the rights are shared with ESPN and Televisa.

International soccer
TV Azteca also holds part or all of the Mexican rights to the FIFA Confederations Cup, Copa América, CONCACAF Gold Cup, and the FIFA World Cup.

In addition, Azteca and competitor Televisa share the rights to the games of the Mexico national football team through 2018.

American football
Azteca 7 has carried NFL games for years. During the regular season, it airs a whip-around program similar to NFL RedZone called Ritual NFL, which covers the early afternoon games. It also airs the Super Bowl and AFC playoff games.

Boxing and lucha libre
Box Azteca, featuring major fights, airs regularly on Azteca 7. Lucha Azteca debuted in 2016, featuring the Liga Élite promotion and revived in 2019 with a new deal with Lucha Libre AAA Worldwide.

Studio shows
The primary studio show produced by Azteca Deportes is the weekly show DeporTV, which airs on Sundays and predates TV Azteca itself by nearly 20 years. Other studio shows, such as Los Protagonistas, have also aired over the years on Azteca 13 and Azteca 7.

Former sports programs
Sports that Azteca has carried in the past but to which it does not currently hold the rights include NBA basketball, NHL hockey and the Olympic Games (whose rights in 2016 were held by América Móvil and subleased to public broadcasters).

Notable personalities

Play-by-play 
 Christian Martinoli
 Antonio Rosique
 Carlos Guerrero
 Paco González
 Jesús Joel Fuentes
 Enrique Garay
 César Castro
 Rodolfo Vargas
 Rafael Ayala

Analysts 

 Luis García Postigo
 Luis Roberto Alves
 Jorge Campos
 David Medrano
 Francisco Chacón
 Joaquín Castillo
 Julio César Chávez
 Marco Antonio Barrera
 Eduardo Lamazón

Anchors 

 Inés Sainz
 Alfredo Domínguez Muro
 Hugo Enrique Kiese

Reporters 

 Álvaro López Sordo
 Omar Villarreal
 Juan Carlos Báez
 Tania Ventimilla
 Jorge Pinto
 Ashley González
 Pablo de Rubens

References

External links
Azteca Deportes website

TV Azteca
Sports divisions of TV channels
Sports television in Mexico